Tibbetibaba also known as Mahasadhak Tibbetibaba or Paramhamsa Tibbetibaba, alternative spellings Tibbatibaba, Tibbati Baba, Tibbeti Baba, Tibbotibaba or Tibboti Baba ("Tibetan Baba" or the Monk from Tibet, when translated into English.) born Nabin Chattopadhhyaya ;Mahasamadhi or death – 19 November 1930) was a famous Bengali philosopher, saint and yogi. He was one of the few saints in India whose life was an amalgamation of the Advaita Vedanta doctrine of Hinduism and Mahayana Buddhist doctrine. Tibbetibaba was a master of all the eight siddhis and supposedly had remarkable healing powers. Even though he was master of all the siddhis, he was not personally interested in using them.

Biography
There were many incidents and events that had taken place in the life of Tibbetibaba (died 19 November 1930). Many events have been recorded in writing by his devotees and disciples and some have not been recorded. Broadly speaking, there are two views regarding events and incidents that had taken place in Tibbetibaba's life. The first view is propounded in books like "Bharater Sadhak O Sadhika" and "Bharater Sadhak – Sadhika." The second view is propounded in biographical books (Tibbatibabar Parichay and Paramhamsa Tibbati Babar Smriti Katha) written by Tibbetibaba's disciples like Kunjeshwar Misra and Akhandananda Brahmachari. Since the books written by Kunjeshwar Misra and Akhandananda Brahmachari have been published by Tibbati Baba Vedanta Ashram (Address - 76/3, Taantipara Lane, P.O. Santragachi, Howrah – 711,104, West Bengal, India), therefore, the view of the second school seems more authentic.

However, the events connected with the life of Tibbetibaba at Palitpur Ashram at Palitpur village (at Burdwan, India), events in other parts of undivided India and Afghanistan, his philosophy, spiritual powers and his teachings seem completely authentic. So views of the former school are given together with the latter school.

First view
This view regarding the events and incidents that had taken place in Tibbetibaba's life is propounded in Bharater Sadhak O Sadhika and Bharater Sadhak – Sadhika.

Early life
Nabin Chandra was born to a Bengali Rarhi Brahmin family. His father was a Tantra yogi who had settled in Assam. While his mother was a Shaivite (a devotee of Shiva). It is said that he did not remember the year, date and month of his birth. His father had died when he was very young. So his mother had to bear great hardships to bring him up.

From his childhood Nabin Chandra had keen interest in nature and used to think about the Maker of this world. But his ideas about the Maker did not tally with his late father's or mother's concept of God. His idea was that God must be very different from what common men and women think Him or Her to be.

Sannyasa
As years passed by, Nabin Chandra entered into the world of teenage. His ideas about God became even more profound. One night, on the occasion of Shivratri festival, he had a brief quarrel regarding God. Consequently, he left his home in search of the person who had created this world.

Ayodhya
After leaving his home, Nabin Chandra met a group of pilgrims in an inn. The destination of the group was Ayodhya, the birthplace of Rama. Nabin Chandra had made up his mind to become sanyasi (a wandering monk) in search of god. He requested the pilgrims to take him with them. The group members agreed and soon began Nabin Chandra's long journey from Assam to Ayodhya. When the group reached Ayodhya, the members except Nabin Chandra began to pay reverence to Rama.

Nabin Chandra's mind was engrossed somewhere else. His concept of God was of indeterminate type, unlike deities like Rama, Shiva and others. So one day he quietly left the group. After crossing the Sarayu River, he headed towards the north. He finally reached Nepal.

Nepal
In Nepal, Nabin Chandra met an unknown Hindu monk who was living in a hut near a river. He began living with the monk. One winter night he expressed to him his desire of acquiring the knowledge of God. The monk asked him to immediately take a dip in the river. After taking a dip in the river he approached the monk and was made a disciple. The monk explained that Nabin had to make an all-out effort to acquire the knowledge of God. He asked Nabin Chandra about his favourite object of love at his home. Nabin Chandra replied that he loved his lamb very dearly. As he was just a teenager, so his guru asked him to meditate on the favourite object of his love i.e. the lamb.

After some years of rigorous meditation Nabin Chandra, finally attained samadhi (super-concentration). Thus he acquired the knowledge of Brahman in animals (which according to Advaita Vedanta Brahman is present even in animals). This type of knowledge corresponded to knowledge of Saguna Brahman.

Manasarovar, Tibet

After attaining knowledge of Brahman in animals, Nabin Chandra headed for Manasarovar Lake in Tibet. He finally managed to reach there, unmindful of the obstacles that he had encountered during his journey from Nepal to Lake Manasarovar in Tibet.

Having reached the lake, he chose a cave near the lake and began meditating on God. He desired to have vision of Brahman (Indeterminate and attributeless God according to Hinduism). Even after meditating for many days he could finally only see darkness as the object of his vision.

Suddenly one day he saw a Tibetan Buddhist lama standing on the entrance of the cave. He thought that perhaps God has sent the person to assist him in his aim of God-realisation. So he earnestly requested the Lama to make him his disciple and help him in realising the knowledge of God.

The Tibetan Buddhist lama agreed to make Nabin his disciple but explained that he did not know the Advaita method of spiritual practice. Since he was a Mahayana monk, he could only teach him Mahayana method of spiritual practice. Nabin Chandra explained that knowledge of Brahman according to Advaita principles is equivalent to nirvana of Buddhism and so he was willing to become his disciple. So under the guidance of the lama, Nabin Chandra learned spiritual practices and beliefs. Now it became easier for him to meditate on Nirguna Brahman (God who is infinite and without attributes). But he realised that by first meditating on Saguna Brahman (God with attributes) he could easily concentrate his mind on Nirguna Brahman (God without attributes). With the change in technique he finally realised his cherished dream of attaining the knowledge of Nirguna Brahman.

Wanderings
Having realised the knowledge of Brahman, Nabin Chandra decided to come down to the plains and wander, following the ideal of his Tibetan Mahayana guru of alleviating the pains and sufferings of the people of the world and inspire them to tread the path of salvation.

Nabin Chandra travelled far and wide spanning the length and breadth of India, Nepal, Bangladesh, Pakistan, Afghanistan and Myanmar, enjoying the indescribable beauty of the Nirguna Brahman who manifests in all beings of this world. Like his ideal, Buddha, he alleviated the sufferings of distressed beings. He combined the teachings of Buddha's path such as love, non-violence and compassion for all living beings, and the Vedantic Hindu teachings of enjoying the presence of Brahman in all beings at the same time.

Kanpur
Kanpur was an important centre of resistance during Indian Rebellion of 1857 (also known as the First War of Indian Independence and the Sepoy Mutiny). Revolt broke out in June 1857 and Nana Sahib was declared as the Peshwa of Kanpur. The rebels defeated General Hugh Wheeler outside the city. But after a pitched battle Sir Colin Campbell recaptured Kanpur in December 1857. Nana Sahib and his Lieutenant, Tantiya Tope, escaped the city. Now the British ire was directed against the common people of Kanpur. Atrocities began to be committed against the masses. Even innocent men and women were not spared. Many people were being imprisoned in the prison-houses. Wandering from place to place, Nabin Chandra appeared in Kanpur. He was pained to see the people of Kanpur being oppressed by the British soldiers and officers. He decided to intervene. He introduced himself as a monk from Tibet (as he had secured spiritual Enlightenment in Tibet) and asked a British officer to stop oppressing the innocent people. But his request went unheeded. Consequently, he had to use his spiritual power to temporarily weaken the soldiers under the British officer. Now the officer had to heed to his request. Nabin Chandra also met the senior officer posted in the city and voluntarily got himself imprisoned to check how the prisoners were being treated. Finally the senior military officer realised his mistake and ordered the release of Nabin Chandra and other prisoners who were with him. Nabin Chandra also got an assurance that innocent people would not be punished by the British military officers and soldiers under them. At this the released prisoners and the people present at the scene hailed Nabin Chandra as their saviour and coined the name Tibbetibaba for him.

Revisit to Nepal
He is among the very few saints in India who have made their soul to permanently or temporarily enter into another human body. According to Hinduism any living human being soul can enter the body of another living or dead human being. This fact is supported by Swami Vivekananda in his book - 'Raj-Yoga or Conquering The Internal Nature'. This can be done when one meditates on the body which is to be entered.

Another known saint said to have achieved the feat is Adi Shankara. He did it when Ubhaya Bharati, the wife of Mandana Mishra, challenged him to have a debate on the "science of sex-love". So to learn the practical aspects of love-making, he entered his soul into the body of a dead king for period of one month. Consequently, Ubhaya Bharati was forced to accept defeat.

In Hinduism it is held that birth and death is like changing one's clothes. Birth occurs when a soul enters a new body. When the soul discards the body the incident is called death.

When after wandering for many years, he found that his body has grown weak; he decided to enter his soul into the body of a Tibetan Buddhist monk. The Tibetan Buddhist monk (Lama) had just entered into the state of Parinirvana.

After getting the new body (the body of the Lama) he resumed his wanderings and began making disciples.

Second view
This is the view as propounded in the biographical books (Tibbatibabar Parichay and Paramhamsa Tibbati Babar Smriti Katha) written by Tibbetibaba's disciples like Kunjeshwar Misra and Akhandananda Brahmachari.

Early life
Tibbetibaba was born in Sylhet (Srihatta), Bangladesh. His original name was Nabin (Nabin Chattopadhyaya according to Kunjeshwar Misra). He was the sixth child of his family. His father and mother were great devotees of Shiva. His father died when he was very young.

Nabin (Nabin Chattopadhyaya) did his early education from his village school. Right from his childhood he was spiritually inclined. At the age of thirteen years, he decided to leave his home to pursue his quest for the knowledge of God.

Search for a Guru
Nabin visited many places like Gaya, Ayodhya and Vrindavan in search of a guru. But he could not find anyone who could be his Guru. Next he went to Amarnath shrine in Kashmir. There he met a monk who advised him to go to Tibet where his desire of finding a Guru would be fulfilled. But he also said that if he went through Nepal, then his journey would be less straining. For entering Tibet via Nepal he (Nabin) would require the permission of the king of Nepal. The monk then told Nabin to first visit the Prime Minister of Nepal who was well acquainted with him (the monk). The Prime Minister would then take him (Nabin) to the king and then he would not find it difficult to get permission to go to Tibet.

Nepal
From Amarnath, Nabin went to Nepal. After visiting many temples and other places, he finally met the Prime Minister of Nepal. He told the Prime Minister about his spiritual thirst and the message sent by the monk he met at Amarnath. The Prime Minister took him to the King of Nepal.

The King was amazed at the spiritual thirst of such a young teenaged boy and he promptly gave him (Nabin) permission to go to Tibet via Nepal. He also gave a letter to him to be given to a Lama known to him (the King).

Tibet
Nabin (Tibbetibaba) entered into Tibet with a group Tibetan businessmen. In Tibet he did not find it difficult to find the Lama recommended by the King of Nepal.

The lama agreed to make Nabin his disciple. He asked him whether he remembered anyone at his home. Nabin fondly remembered his buffalo. Now the Lama asked him to meditate on the image of buffalo in his mind. Thus began Nabin's meditation and after intense meditation for one year, he attained Nirvikalpa samadhi of Saguna Brahman (God with attributes).

The lama was amazed at the achievement of attaining samadhi at such a young age. He then took Nabin to a famed lama named Paramananda Thakkar. Paramananda was a very great lama of Tibet and had reached the acme of Advaita Vedanta, tantra and Mahayana Buddhism. The Lama requested that Paramananda make Nabin his disciple. Paramananda agreed to give shelter to Nabin, but did not immediately make Nabin his disciple. Nabin had to first prove his worth. So Nabin selflessly served his new master for a few years. Finally Paramananda was pleased with Nabin's service and made him his disciple.

Under Paramananda, Nabin rigorously followed the principles of yoga, tantra, Advaita Vedanta and Mahayana Buddhism for six years and reached great heights of these doctrines. He finally attained Nirvikalpa samadhi of Nirguna Brahman (God without attributes) and his childhood dream of gaining knowledge of Indeterminate God was fulfilled.

Now Nabin's guru asked him to visit other places of Tibet to gain perfection in spiritual knowledge. So Nabin embarked upon visiting other places of Tibet. His fame and respect as spiritually accomplished person grew in whole Tibet and began to be respected as a great person. Nabin stayed in Tibet for forty years, during which he learned many healing techniques from many lamas and old Tibetan medical texts.

Wanderings
Having stayed in Tibet for a long time, Nabin decided to visit other parts of the world. Starting from the Changtang region of Tibet; he began his long journey of visiting places like China, Mongolia, Russia (Siberia region and Myanmar. He was well received everywhere and his respect as a healer and spiritually accomplished man grew manifold. He became literate in the languages of the countries he visited. Among the foreign languages known by him were: English, Mandarin, Tibetan, Russian, Mongolian, Burmese.
He next entered into India and visited many places. When the Buddhist monks of Myanmar learned of his long stay and accomplishments in Tibet, they coined the name Tibbetibaba for him.

On his second visit to Myanmar, with the permission of the King and Queen of Myanmar, who were his great devotees, he transmigrated his soul into the body of the dead prince of Myanmar. This was done because his original body had grown weak and feeble on account of old age.

Devotee of Buddha
 Tibbetibaba was ardently devoted to Buddha. He incorporated into his life love, compassion and non-violence and towards all living beings from the teachings of Buddha. He died at his ashram in Palitpur village in Burdwan, India, after keeping an idol of Buddha in front of him.

Ashrams
Two ashrams were established – one at Dalal Pukur locality of Santragachi area of Howrah city, India and another at Palitpur village of Burdwan district, India.

Howrah ashram
In November 1929 (2nd Agrahayana of Bengali calendar 1336) an ashram was established at Santragachhi in Howrah, India by Tibbetibaba. Land for the ashram was bought by a man named Bishnupada Chattopadhyaya (later known as Bhooan Swami). The first brick for the ashram was laid by Tibbetibaba himself. Later, more land for the ashram was bought by a man from Entally area of Kolkata.

This ashram was given the name Tibbetibaba Vedanta Ashram by his devotees and disciples. It is commonly referred to as Tibbetibaba (Tibbati Baba) Ashram by the common people of Dalal Pukur area. Tibbatibaba Lane, beside Dalal Pukur (a large pond of the area), is named after the saint.

Palitpur ashram
The Palitpur ashram is located at Palitpur village in Burdwan, West Bengal, India. Land for ashram was donated by Bhootnath Ta. He was also assisted by Dharma Das and some of friends in his efforts to get the ashram constructed. This ashram was given the name of Pragya Mandir (Temple of Consciousness).

On 19 November 1930 (Corresponding date, month and year of Bengali calendar: 2nd Ogrohayon, 1337), after midnight he died at this ashram. Later his Samadhi (tomb) was built here.

The ashram also has Samadhi (tomb) of Soham Swami, his disciple.

Healing powers
He had remarkable healing powers. His healing powers (combined with his knowledge of innumerable herbs and animal products) alleviated the diseases and physical problems of many people.

The first lessons of the art of healing were learnt from Dindayal Upadhyaya of Gaya, who was an Ayurvedic practitioner. Further knowledge and techniques of healing were learnt from the Lamas and the Buddhist Tantrics of Tibet.

Teachings
 One must not consider oneself as body or mind as each person is the supreme infinite soul or God (This teaching is in accordance with the Advaita philosophy).
 One must lead one's life based on truth.
 The causes of emotions like fear and shame is the false association of Self or Atman (soul) with the body and mind. When one gets knowledge that Self or Atman (soul) is different from body or mind, then these emotions disappear
 When people get entangled in evil deeds they can again become pure and good by means of good discourse and suggestion.
 One cannot fully love another person without seeing oneself in the other person.

Notable disciples
His admirers, disciples and devotees ranged from undivided India to Afghanistan, Russia, Tibet, China, Mongolia, Japan and Myanmar(Burma). Some of his famous disciples were:
 Dharmadas Rai: He was a great devotee and disciple of Tibbetibaba. He was a companion of Tibbettibaba in his wanderings to southern India. He was a resident of Channa village.

 Kunjeshwar Misra: A resident of north Kolkata, he was an allopath medical practitioner (doctor) by profession. He had written books named Tibbatibabar Parichay (This was a biography on Tibbetibaba), Chanditatve Ved O Vigyan, Ramayan Bodh Ba Balmikir Atmaprakash and  Gleanings from Ramayana, Ramayan Bodh, and Adhyatatva Koumudi: Raasleela Prabhriti Prabandhabali.
 Akshay Mitra.
 Soham Swami, whose original name was Shyamakanta Bandopaddhyaya, was Tibbetibaba's Advaita Vedantic disciple.

 He had so much physical strength that he could wrestle even tigers. Soham Swami had ashram in both in Nainital and Haridwar. The writings of Soham Swami include the books Soham Gita, Soham Samhita, Common Sense and Truth (this book was the only book written by him in English poetry. It was published in Calcutta, now Kolkata, in 1913).
 Jatindra Nath Banerjee, who was a very active revolutionary (of India's Freedom Struggle) during the first decade of the twentieth century of India's freedom struggle, perhaps became the most famous disciple of Soham Swami. He was among the initial members of Anushilan Samiti which was established in 1902. He was rechristened Niralamba Swami and he established an ashram at Channa village, Burdwan, India. Niralamba Swami had hailed Tibbetibaba as one of the greatest exponent of Advaita Vedanta after Adi Shankara when he visited him at his ashram in Channa village. Niralamba Swami had written an introduction to the book named 'Common Sense.' This book is mentioned by Bhagat Singh in his famous work, 'Why I Am An Atheist.' Bhagat Singh was a legendary freedom fighter of India. Bhagat Singh had met Niralamba Swami at Channa ashram at Channa village in the beginning of 1929(1927- 1928 according to some).
 Mong Paine: He was a Burmese.
 Bhootnath Ta: He was the landlord of Palitpur village, near Burdwan town in the Burdwan district of West Bengal in India. He had donated land for the Palitpur ashram. His ancestors at present are living in Burdwan town.
 Dharma Das Mondal: He was a resident of Palitpur village.
 Dwijapada: Tibbetibaba had narrated many incidents related to his life to him.
 Sadhana Moitra: She was a direct female disciple of Tibbetibaba. Dr. Kunjeshwar Mishra was the husband of the sister-in-law of Sadhana Moitra.

Philosophy
The philosophy of Tibbetibaba has been well explained in the following books: "Bharater Sadhak O Sadhika", “Bharater Sadhak – Sadhika”, Tibbatibabar Parichay'”, and Paramhamsa Tibbati Babar Smriti Katha.Ghosh, Sudhanshu Ranjan, "Bharater Sadhak O Sadhika", India: Tuli Kalam Publication, 1, College Row, Kolkata – 700,009 (1992.Bengali calendar year – 1399), pp.323-327,329-331Brahmachari, Akhandananda, Paramhamsa Tibbati Babar Smriti Katha, India: Tibbati Baba Vedanta Ashram, 76/3, Taantipara Lane, P.O. Santragachi, Howrah – 711,104, West Bengal (May 2003), pp.1-50

Tibbetibaba aspired and practised Mahayana doctrine and the Advaita Vedanta doctrine at the same time. The Universalism of Mahayana ideal helped him to reach the infinite world of knowledge of Brahman of Advaita Vedanta. He had said that the experience of knowing Brahman can also make a person to realise the Universalism of the Mahayana doctrine. It helps a person to embrace the whole world.

According to him when the believers of Advaita Vedanta attain success in their endeavour of knowing Brahman then the name differences (Nama Bheda), visual perception differences (Rupa Bheda) and the differences in attributes (Guna Bheda) of the world slowly vanish for the yogi. In other words, homogeneous differences (Sajatiya Bheda), heterogeneous differences (Vijatiya Bheda) and internal differences (Svagata Bheda) slowly disappear. Then it becomes say for the believer to easily love any living being. This can easily help in transmitting Buddha's message of love, compassion, goodwill and non-violence to any living being, even to wild and ferocious animals.

He stressed the fact that one gains the knowledge of atman (soul) by great efforts. Atman is self-illuminating and of the nature of true knowledge. Attaining Nirvana is equivalent to knowing the Atman. By knowing the Atman all animate as well as inanimate things can be known. Without knowing the Atman the perception of differences cannot vanish fully and consequently one finds it difficult to fully show compassion and love towards all living-beings.

He also said that the Upanishads declare that there is nothing beyond the Atman and Paramatma (God) is the highest manifestation of Atman.

Buddha means 'The Enlightened One.' Buddha identified oneself with everyone in this world. A Soham Swami or Paramahamsa (According to Advaita Vedanta any person who reaches the pinnacle of spirituality is known as Soham Swami or Paramahamsa) also does the same. Thus we find that Advaita Vedanta and Mahayana doctrine may have differences, but, they also have similarities. The similarities are with regard to the nature of truth and truth is universal.

There is no great difference Brahman or Paramatma of Vedanta and Universalism of Mahayana doctrine. Buddha had told,"As a mother, even at the risk of her life, protects her son; so let him who has recognised the truth, cultivate goodwill among all beings without measure." This kindness is without any obstacles, hatred and enmity in the mind. This type of attitude is to be found in Advaita Vedanta also. It is known as Brahman (Brahma) Vihara (Brahma Vihara is living and moving and having one's happiness in the attitude of Brahman). So Brahman Vihara is equivalent to Buddha's infinite friendly attitude, goodwill and compassion towards all living-beings.

Tibbetibaba knew the similarities and dissimilarities between Mahayana doctrine and Advaita Vedanta doctrine, but he laid stress on the similarities. He led a life based on the similarities.

Another aspect of Tibbetibaba's philosophy was public service. He engaged in public service by giving good suggestions to all and by practising his healing powers.

Views
 That God exists is proven by the fact that the sky, in spite of being empty, is still filled with light (during daytime).
 When a snake touches and coils itself around the body of a person absorbed in deep meditation and the person does not feel the presence of the snake then the person is said to have achieved perfection in meditation.
 A Shakta is not one who seeks mada (fermented alcoholic beverages) and maithuna (sex), but one who realises the manifestation of Shakti in all living beings.
...Come with me; I will teach you to subdue the beasts of ignorance roaming in jungles of the human mind. You are used to an audience:let it be a galaxy of angels, entertained by your thrilling mastery of yoga.

See also

 Advaita Vedanta
 Mahayana
 Nondualism
 Buddhism
 Buddhist terms and concepts
 Palitpur
 Channa village

Further reading
 Ghosh, Sudhanshu Ranjan, "Bharater Sadhak O Sadhika" (Bengali edition), India: Tuli Kalam Publication, 1, College Row, Kolkata – 700,009 (1992.Bengali calendar year – 1399), pp. 318–343
 Chakravorty, Subodh, "Bharater Sadhak – Sadhika" (Bengali edition), India: Kamini Publication, 115, Akhil Mistry Lane, Kolkata – 700,009 (1997.Bengali calendar year – 1404), Volume 1, pp. 450–478 and 500-522
 Brahmachari, Akhandananda, Paramhamsa Tibbati Babar Smriti Katha(Bengali edition), India: Tibbati Baba Vedanta Ashram, 76/3, Taantipara Lane, P.O. Santragachi, Howrah – 711,104, West Bengal (May 2003), pp. 1-
 Misra, Kunjeshwar, Tibbatibabar Parichay(Bengali edition), India: Tibbati Baba Vedanta Ashram, 76/3, Taantipara Lane, P.O. Santragachi, Howrah – 711,104, West Bengal (1934. Bengali calendar year – 1341)
Shankarnath Roy, Bharater Sadhak (Bengali edition), India: Prachi Publications, 3 and 4, Hare Street, (Tetta), Kolkata - 700,001 West Bengal (ed. 1980), Volume - 9. pp. 213–241

References

Notes

 Ghosh, Sudhanshu Ranjan, "Bharater Sadhak O Sadhika" (Indian Saints and Mystics),(Bengali edition), India: Tuli Kalam Publication, 1, College Row, Kolkata – 700,009 (1992.Bengali calendar year – 1399), pp. 318–343
 Chakravorty, Subodh, "Bharater Sadhak – Sadhika" (Indian Saints and Mystics),(Bengali edition), India: Kamini Publication, 115, Akhil Mistry Lane, Kolkata – 700,009 (1997.Bengali calendar year – 1404), Volume 1, pp. 450–478 and 500-522
 Grover, G.L. & Grover, S., A New Look At Modern Indian History (17th ed.), India: S. Chand Publication (2000). , pp. 283–284.
 Murphet, Howard, Sai Baba: Man of Miracles, Weiser Boo Publication, (1977). , p. 152. Page available 
 Sanyal, Jagadiswar, Guide To Indian Philosophy (1996 ed.), India: Sribhumi Publishing Company (1999), 79, Mahatma Gandhi Road, Kolkata - 700,009.
 "Thus Spake the Buddha", India: Sri Ramakrishna Math, Mylapore, Chennai - 600,004. , pp. 13 and 42
 "Complete Works of Rabindranath Tagore", India: Black Rose publications, 229, Bhola Nath Nagar, Shahdara, New Delhi - 110,032, p. 379
 Hornby, A S, "Oxford Advanced Learner's Dictionary of Current English" (5th ed.), UK: Oxford University Press (1998). , pp. 1433–1475.
 Why I am an Atheist: Bhagat Singh, People's Publishing House, New Delhi, India.
Page available 
 Swami, Soham, "Common Sense", Bangladesh: Surja Kanta Banerjee, Gandharia Press, Dacca (Dhaka) (1928). pp. 1–3.
 Misra, Kunjeshwar, Tibbatibabar Parichay (Introduction to Tibbetibaba), (Bengali edition), India: Tibbati Baba Vedanta Ashram, 76/3, Taantipara Lane, P.O. Santragachi, Howrah – 711,104, West Bengal (1934. Bengali calendar year – 1341), pp. 1–60
 Misra, Kunjeshwar, Ramayan Bodh Ba Balmikir Atmaprakash (Bengali edition), (2nd ed.) India: Tibbati Baba Vedanta Ashram, 76/3, Taantipara Lane, P.O. Santragachi, Howrah – 711,104, West Bengal (2006. Bengali calendar year – 1413), pp. 1–4
 Misra, Kunjeshwar, " Chanditatve Ved O Vigyan" (Bengali edition), India: Tibbatibaba Vedanta Ashram, Tibbatibaba Lane, Santragachi, Howrah – 711,104 (1947. Bengali calendar year – 1354), p. 1
 Brahmachari, Akhandananda, Paramhamsa Tibbati Babar Smriti Katha''(Reminiscences of Tibbetibaba),(Bengali edition), India: Tibbati Baba Vedanta Ashram, 76/3, Taantipara Lane, P.O. Santragachi, Howrah – 711,104, West Bengal (May 2003), pp. 1–50
 Sharma, I. Mallikarjuna, “In retrospect: Sagas of heroism and sacrifice of Indian revolutionaries”, Ravi Sasi Enterprises, India (edition: 1999). p. 94. Page Available 
 Roy Dilip Kumar, Devi Indira, "Pilgrims of the stars: autobiography of two yogis”,
India (edition: 1985). p. 357. Page available: 
 Municipal Corporation, Calcutta (India), "Calcutta municipal gazette", Office of the Registrar of Newspapers. Press, India (edition: 1972). p. 127. Page Available: 
 Indian Bibliographic Centre. Research Wing, "Dictionary of Indian biography", Indian Bibliographic Centre, India (edition: 2000). p. 32.
 Jatinder Nath Sanyal, Kripal Chandra Yadav, Bhagat Singh, Babar Singh, The Bhagat Singh Foundation, “Bhagat Singh: a biography”, Hope India Publication, India (edition: 2006). p. 84. Page Available: 
 University, Banaras Hindu, "Prajña", Banaras Hindu University, Benaras, India (edition: 1972). p. 110. Page Available: 
 Jadavpur University. Dept. of International Relations Jadavpur Journal of International Relations, "Jadavpur Journal of International Relations", Dept. of International Relations, Jadavpur University, Kolkata, India. (edition: 2001). pp. 117 and 122. Page Available: 
 Indian Bibliographic Centre. Research Wing, Indian Bibliographic Centre. "Dictionary of Indian biography", Indian Bibliographic Centre (edition 2000). , . p. 32. Page available: 
 Durga Das Pvt. Ltd, "Eminent Indians who was who, 1900-1980, also annual diary of events", Durga Das Pvt. Ltd., India. (edition 1985). p. 25. Page available: 
 Sen, Siba Pada, "Dictionary of national biography", Institute of Historical Studies, India (edition 1972). p. 114. Page available: 
 Mukherjee, Uma, "Two great Indian revolutionaries: Rash Behari Bose & Jyotindra Nath Mukherjee”, Firma K. L. Mukhopadhyay. (edition 1966). p. 101. Page available: 
 University of Burdwan Dept. of History, "History: journal of the Department of History”, University of Burdwan, India. (edition 1998). p. 85. Page available: 
 Majumdar, Bimanbehari, "Militant nationalism in India and its socio-religious background, 1897-1917", General Printers & Publishers, India (edition 1966. p. 101. Page available: 
 Keshavmurti, "Sri Aurobindo, the hope of man", Dipti Publications, India. (edition 1969). p. 258. Page available: 
 Heehs, Peter, "The bomb in Bengal: the rise of revolutionary terrorism in India, 1900-1910”, Oxford University Press. (edition 1993). p. 62. Page available: 
 Gupta, Gopal Dass, "Glossary and index of proper names in Sri Aurobindo's works", Sri Aurobindo Ashram, India. (edition 1989). , . p. 34
 "A bibliography of Indian English", Central Institute of English and Foreign Languages, India. (edition 1972). p. 97.

External links

 
1820 births
1930 deaths
19th-century Indian philosophers
Advaitin philosophers
Bengali Hindus
Bengali philosophers
Buddhist new religious movements
19th-century Hindu philosophers and theologians
20th-century Hindu philosophers and theologians
Indian Hindu saints
Indian Hindu spiritual teachers
Indian Hindu monks
20th-century Indian philosophers
Indian yogis
People from West Bengal
Tibet
Vedanta
Year of birth unknown